Guy Maxwell Aylwin AAdipl FRIBA (1889–1968) was a  British architect, practising almost wholly in the West Surrey area around Farnham.

Biography

Early career 
Aylwin was articled with the Farnham practice of Niven & Wigglesworth between 1910 and 1913, which had its main offices in London, although the senior partner, David Barclay Niven (1864–1942) lived in Farnham. Harold Falkner had also been a pupil of Niven & Wigglesworth and for a time was in partnership with both men as Niven, Wigglesworth & Falkner. In an illustration by Paul Phipps of the pupils of Lutyens, one of the figures is of a G. Alwyn, but is not clear if this is the same person. In 1927, he joined Falkner in the firm of Falkner & Aylwin, but this was dissolved after only three years, in 1930, although Falkner continued to use the partnership name until 1932. From then on, Aylwin worked by himself until he was joined by his son, John Maxwell Aylwin and John's wife, both architects. His daughter Jill, also an architect, joined them in the offices. John died in 1999 and the Aylwin family practice of architects ceased to exist.

Falkner & Aylwin
Aylwin designed many buildings in a vernacular and Arts & Crafts style around Farnham, both houses and civic buildings, such as the Town Hall and the Bush Hotel in The Borough, Farnham. He also received much work from Courage Brewery in Alton, such as the Princess Royal and Jolly Farmer pubs in Runfold, the Seven Stars in East Street, Farnham being good examples of their type and designed with Falkner. He also designed the Wooden Bridge along the old A3 in Guildford.

Personal life 
Like his sometime business partner and colleague, Falkner, Aylwin was educated at Farnham Grammar School. From there he went to King's College, London and the Architectural Association and was elected finally as a Fellow of the RIBA.  He was married to Connie and they had four children - John, Jim, Jill and Tony. Both John and Jill became architects.

Legacy 
In 2010, a part of his archive and some of his architectural drawings and models were donated by his grandson, Richard Aylwin, to the Blower Foundation, where they are archived and maintained. He also edited and revised a history of architecture by HH Statham.

Gallery

References

Bibliography
 West Surrey Architects, by Christopher Budgen. Woking: Heritage of Waverley, 2002 (paperback).
 Harold Falkner: More Than an Arts & Crafts Architect, by Sam Osmond. Chichester: Phillimore, 2003 (paperback).
 The Surrey Style, by Roderick Gradidge. Kingston: Surrey Historic Buildings Trust, 1991 (paperback).
 A Short Critical History of Architecture, by Henry Heathcote Staham, 2nd Edition edited and revised by Guy Maxwell Aylwin. BT Batsford. 1927.

External links
The Blower Foundation (for cultural connection) is a registered UK Charity devoted to cultural heritage and expression and  holds an archive of drawings and buildings designed by both Aylwins and have an online gallery of  their buildings.
Farnham Museum  hold correspondence and archives from Harold Falkner that may include some of the work they completed together in partnership as Falkner & Aylwin, salvaged from a skip after Falkner's death and the closure of his offices in West Street, Farnham.

1889 births
1968 deaths
Alumni of King's College London
Architects from Surrey
Arts and Crafts architects
People from Farnham
Fellows of the Royal Institute of British Architects